This is a list of troubadours and trobairitz, men and women who are known to have written lyric verse in the Old Occitan language.

They are listed alphabetically by first name. Those whose first name is uncertain or unknown are listed by nickname or title, ignoring any initial definite article (i.e., lo, la). All entries are given in Old Occitan (where known) and a standardized spelling (where possible). Thus, e.g., William IX of Aquitaine is listed under Guilhem, the Occitan form of William.

A

Ademar de Peiteus
Ademar de Rocaficha
Ademar Jordan
Ademar lo Negre
Aimeric de Belenoi
Aimeric de Peguilhan
Aimeric de Sarlat
Alaisina
Alamanda de Castelnau
Alberjat
Albert Malaspina
Albert de Saint Bonet
Albertet Cailla
Albertet de Sestaro
Albric
Aldric del Vilar
Alegret
Alexandre
Almucs de Castelnau
Amanieu de la Broqueira
Amanieu de Sescars
Amoros dau Luc
Anfos, reis d'Aragon
Arnaut Bernart de Tarascon
Arnaut de Brantalo
Arnaut Catalan
Arnaut Daniel
Arnaut de Cumenge
Arnaut de Maroill
Arnaut de Tintinhac
Arnaut Guilhem de Marsan
Arnaut Peire d'Agange
Arnaut Plagues
Arnaut Romieu
Arnaut Vidal de Castelnou d'Ari
Arver
At de Mons
Audoi
Audric del Vilar
Austorc d'Aorlhac
Austorc de Segret
Austorc del Boy
Aycart del Fossat
Azalais d'Altier
Azalais de Porcairagues

B

Baussan
Berenguer d'Anoia
Berenguier de Palazol
Berenguier de Poivent
Berenguier de Poizrengier
Berenguier Trobel
Bermon Rascas
Bernart Alanhan de Narbona
Bernart Amoros
Bernart Arnaut d'Armagnac
Bernart Arnaut de Moncuc
Bernart d'Astarac
Bernart d'Auriac
Bernart de Bondeills
Bernart de Durfort
Bernart de la Barta
Bernart de la Fon
Bernart de Panassac
Bernart de Pradas
Bernart de Rovenac
Bernart de Tot-lo-mon
Bernart de Ventadorn
Bernart de Venzac
Bernart Marti
Bernart Sicart de Marvejols
Bernart Tortitz
Bertolome Zorzi
Bertran Albaric
Bertran Astorgat
Bertran Carbonel
Bertran d'Alamanon
Bertran d'Aurel
Bertran de Born
Bertran de Born lo Filhs
Bertran de Gordo
Bertran de la Tor
Bertran de Paris
Bertran de Preissac
Bertran de Saint Felitz
Bertran del Pojet
Bertran Folcon d'Avinhon
Bieiris de Romans
Blacasset
Blacatz
Bonafe
Bonafos
Bonfilh
Bonifaci Calvo
Bonifaci de Castellana
Bord del rei d'Arago

C

Cadenet
Calega Panzan
Cantarel
Carenza
Castelloza
Cavaire
Cercamon
Certan
Chardo
Clara d'Anduza
Codolet
Coine
Coms de Blandra
Coms de Bretaigna
Coms de Foix
Coms de Rodes
Coms de Toloza
Comtessa de Dia
Comtessa de Proensa
Cossezen

D

Dalfi d'Alvernha
Dalfinet
Dante Alighieri
Dante da Maiano
Daude de Carlus
Daude de Pradas
Duran Sartor de Paernas

E

Eble de Saignas
Eble de Ventadorn
Eble d'Ussel
Elias Cairel
Elias de Barjols
Elias d'Ussel
Elias Fonsalada
Elias de Rosegnols
Engenim d'Urre de Valentinès
Engles
Envejos
Escaronha de l'Isla Jordan
Escudier de la Ilha
Esquileta
Esteve
Estornel

F

Felip Engles
Felip de Valenza
Ferrari de Ferrara
Folquet de Lunel
Folquet de Marselha
Folquet de Romans
Formit de Perpignan
Fortunier
Frederic de Sicilia

G

Galaubet
Garcia Meendiz d'Eixo
Garin d'Apchier
Garin lo Brun
Gasquet
Gaucelm Estaca
Gaucelm Faidit
Gaudairenca
Gausbert Amiel
Gausbert de Puicibot
Gauseran de Saint Leidier
Gavaudan
Gilabert de Próixita
Girard Cavalaz
Gormonda de Monpeslier
Granet
Grimoart Gausmar
Gui de Cavaillo
Gui de Glotos
Gui d'Ussel
Guibert
Guigo de Cabanas
Guigo de Saint Didier
Guillalmet
Guillalmi
Guillelmi
Guilhelma de Rosers
Guilhem Ademar
Guilhem Anelier de Tolosa
Guilhem Augier de Grassa
Guilhem Augier Novella
Guilhem d'Anduza
Guilhem d'Autpol
Guilhem de Balaun
Guilhem de Berguedan
Guilhem de Biars
Guilhem de Cabestaing
Guilhem de Dosfraires
Guilhem de Durfort
Guilhem de Gap
Guilhem de la Tor
Guilhem de l'Olivier
Guilhem de Montanhagol
Guilhem de Mur
Guilhem de Peiteus
Guilhem de Ribas
Guilhem de Saint Gregori
Guilhem de Saint Leidier
Guilhem del Baus
Guilhem d'Ieiras
Guilhem Fabre
Guilhem Figueira
Guilhem Magret
Guilhem Peire Cazals de Caortz
Guilhem Raimon
Guilhem Raimon de Gironela
Guilhem Rainier
Guilhem Rainol d'At
Guilhem Uc d'Albi
Guillem de Masdovelles
Guiraudo lo Ros
Guiraut de Bornelh
Guiraut de Cabreira
Guiraut de Calanso
Guiraut de Salignac
Guiraut d'Espaigna
Guiraut del Luc
Guiraut Riquier
Guossalbo Roitz

I

Isarn Marques
Isarn Rizol
Iseut de Capio
Iznart d'Entrevenas

J

Jacme (II) d'Arago
Jacme Escriva
Jacme Grils
Jacme Mote d'Arle
Jacme Rovira
Jaufre de Foixa
Jaufre de Pon
Jaufre de Pons
Jaufre Reforzat de Trets
Jaufre Rudel
Javare
Joan Aguila
Joan d'Albuzo
Joan Blanch
Joan de Castellnou
Joan de Pennas
Joan Esteve de Bezers
Joan Lag
Joan Miralhas
Johanet d'Albusson
Jordan Bonel de Confolens
Jordan de Born
Jordan de l'Isla de Venessi
Jordan, senher de la Yla
Jori
Joyos de Tolosa
Jutge

K
Karles, coms de Proensa

L

Lanfranc Cigala
Lantelm
Lantelmet de l'Aguillo
Lanza Marques
Lemozi
Lisa de Londres
Lombarda
Lorenz Mallol
Luca Grimaldi
Luchetz Gateluz

M

Mainart Ros
Marcabru
Marcoat
Maria de Ventadorn
Marques de Canilhac
Matfre Ermengau
Matheu
Matieu de Caersi
Miquel de Castillon
Miquel de la Tor
Mir Bernart
Monge
Monge de Foissan
Monge de Montaudon
Montan
Montan Sartre

N
Nicolet de Turin

O

Obs de Biguli
Olivier de la Mar
Olivier lo Templier
Osmondo da Verona
Oste
Ot de Montcada
Ozil de Cadartz

P

Palaizi
Paul Lanfranc
Paulet de Marselha
Paves
Peire Basc
Peire Bonasa
Peire Bremon lo Tort
Peire Bremon Ricas Novas
Peire Camor
Peire Cardenal
Peire Catala
Peire de Cols d'Aorlac
Peire d'Alvernha
Peire (II) d'Arago
Peire (III) d'Arago
Peire de Barjac
Peire de Bragairac
Peire de Bussignac
Peire de Castelnou
Peire de Cazals
Peire de Corbiac
Peire de Durban
Peire de Gavaret
Peire de la Caravana
Peire de la Mula
Peire de Ladils
Peire de Maensac
Peire de Monzo
Peire de Rius
Peire d'Estanh
Peire de Valeira
Peire del Pol
Peire del Vern
Peire del Vilar
Peire Duran
Peire d'Ussel
Peire Ermengau
Peire Espanhol
Peire Gauseran
Peire Guilhem de Luserna
Peire Guilhem de Tolosa
Peire Imbert
Peire Laroque
Peire Lunel de Montech
Peire Milo
Peire Pelet
Peire Pelissier
Peire Raimon de Tolosa
Peire Rogier
Peire Salvatge
Peire Torat
Peire Trabustal
Peire Vidal
Peirol
Peironet
Pelardit
Pelestort
Perseval Doria
Perdigon
Pistoleta
Pomariol
Pons Barba
Pons de Capduelh
Pons de la Garda
Pons de Monlaur
Pons d'Ortafas
Pons Fabre d'Uzes
Pons Huc d'Empuria
Pons Santolh
Ponson
Pouzet
Prebost de Limotges
Prebost de Valensa
Pujol

R

Raimbaudet
Raimbaut (III) d'Aurenga
Raimbaut (IV) d'Aurenga
Raimbaut de Beljoc
Raimabut d'Eira
Raimbaut de Vaqueiras
Raimon Berenguier de Proensa
Raimon Bistortz d'Arle
Raimon d'Anjou
Raimon d'Avinhon
Raimon de Castelnou
Raimon de Cornet
Raimon de Durfort
Raimon de las Salas
Raimon de Miravalh
Raimon de Rusillon
Raimon de Tors de Marseilha
Raimon Ermengau
Raimon Escrivan
Raimon Estaca
Raimon Feraut
Raimon Gaucelm de Bezers
Raimon Guilhem
Raimon Izarn
Raimon Jordan
Raimon Menudet
Raimon Rigaut
Raimon Vidal de Bezaudun
Rainaut de Pons
Rainaut de Tres Sauzes
Ramberti de Buvalel
Reculaire
Ricau de Tarascon
Ricaut Bonomel
Richartz, reis dels Engles
Rigaut de Berbezilh
Rodrigo
Rofian
Romeu de Vilanova
Rostaing Berenguier
Rostanh de Merguas
Rubaut

S

Sail d'Escola
Savaric de Malleo
Scot
Serveri de Girona
Sifre
Simon Doria
Sordel

T

Taurel
Thomas Periz de Fozes
Tibaut de Blizon
Tibors de Sarenom
Tomas
Tomier
Torcafol
Tremoleta
Tribolet
Trobaire de Villa-Arnaut
Trufarel
Turc Malec

U

Uc Brunet
Uc Catola
Uc de la Bacalaria
Uc de Lescura
Uc de Mataplana
Uc de Murel
Uc de Pena
Uc de Saint Circ

V
Vaquier
Vescoms de Torena
Vesques de Basaz
Vesques de Clarmon

Y
Ysabella
Yselda

Notes

Troubadours
Troubadours
Troubadours

Comp

gl:Trobadorismo#Trobadores, segreis e xoglares

pt:Trovadorismo#Trovadores